The Kunan Poshspora incident  was an alleged mass rape that occurred on 23 February 1991 when unit(s) of the Indian security forces, after being fired upon by militants, launched a search operation in the twin villages of Kunan and Poshpora, located in Kashmir's remote Kupwara District. The residents of the neighbourhood stated that militants had fired on soldiers nearby, which prompted the operation. Some of the villagers claimed that many women were raped by soldiers that night. The first information report filed in the police station after a visit by the local magistrate reported the number of women alleging rape as 23. However, Human Rights Watch asserts that this number could be between 23 and 100. These allegations were denied by the army. The government determined that the evidence was not sufficient and issued a statement condemning the allegations as terrorist propaganda.

While the Government's investigations into the incident rejected the allegations as 'baseless', international human rights organizations have expressed serious doubts about the integrity of these investigations and the manner in which they were conducted, Human Rights Watch stated that the government had launched a "campaign to acquit the army of charges of human rights violations and discredit those who brought the charges."

Incident
The New York Times had quoted the residents of the Kunan Poshpora neighbourhood stating that militants had fired on security forces nearby, which prompted the search operation by the forces. On 23 February 1991 the paramilitary troops of the Central Reserve Police Force and the Border Security Force cordoned off the twin villages of Kunan and Poshpora to conduct a search operation for the militants. The men in the village were assembled outside and interrogated about the militant activity while the village was searched. After the search operation was over, some of the villagers claimed that many women were allegedly raped by soldiers that night.

Later on the local Islamic militant the leader of the Hizbi Islami organization named Mushtaq ul-Islam gave an interview to the New York Times. His Islamic fundamentalist organization supported Kashmir to join Pakistan. The militant leader denied the claim that the group had shot first, but added that his commandos were armed to fight the forces off.

Investigations
On 5 March, villagers complained about the incident to local magistrate S. M. Yasin. After visiting the village on 7 March, he filed his report that included statements from 23 women alleging they have been raped. The increased publicity about the incident in the national media led to strong denials from military officials. On 8 March, an FIR was registered at Trehgam police station, that mentioned 23 women were allegedly gangraped in Kunan and Poshpora.

On 17 March, Mufti Baha-ud-Din Farooqi, Chief Justice of the High Court of Jammu and Kashmir, led a fact-finding delegation to Kunan Poshpora. Over the course of his investigation, he interviewed 53 women who alleged to have been raped by the soldiers, and tried to determine why a police investigation into the incident had never taken place. According to his report, villagers claimed that a police investigation into the event had never commenced because the officer assigned to the case, Assistant Superintendent Dilbaugh Singh, was on leave. Farooqi later stated that in this case "normal investigative procedures were ignored".  Just a few months later, in July, 1991, Dilbaugh Singh was transferred to another station without ever having started the investigation.

On 18 March, Wajahat Habibullah, the divisional commissioner, after a visit to the village filed a report. Habibullah had found the complaint to be exaggerated but not unfounded. A certificate of good behaviour was given to the troops before departing from Kunan Poshpura, by the village headman known as lumbardar. The lumbardar had told Habibullah his unawareness of the alleged crimes against the women. Habibullah's report concluded that the veracity of the complaint was highly doubtful, but the reason for such a complaint should be investigated. The report recommended for further investigation by "a gazetted police officer".

Press Council of India
The government's investigation was criticized; subsequently the Press Council of India, a statutory and quasi-judicial body of the print media, appointed a committee for the investigation of the incident. The investigative committee visited Kunan Poshpora in June. Upon interviewing a number of the alleged victims, the team claimed that contradictions in their testimony rendered their allegations of rape "baseless". A pediatrician who was a member of a citizen's group named as the Jammu and Kashmir People's Basic Rights Committee and had made the allegation that one of the women who had been pregnant at the time of the incident had given birth to a child with a fractured arm just four days later. The investigative committee interviewed the hospital officials and concluded that injuries like this may happen due to the efforts of doctors, who are trying to position the unborn fetus for a delivery. 

On 15 and 21 March, Medical examinations were conducted on 32 of the women, confirmed presence of abrasions on their chests and abdomens, and three of the unmarried women had torn hymens. The team concluded that "such a delayed medical examination proves nothing" and that such abrasions are commonly found among villagers in Kashmir. The hymen can be torn due to natural factors, injury, or premarital sex. 

In stark contrast of the purported allegations of abuses, these investigations concluded the allegations themselves are "grossly exaggerated or invented". The team concluded that the charges against the army were "a massive hoax orchestrated by militant groups and their sympathizers and mentors in Kashmir and abroad as a part of sustained and cleverly contrived strategy of psychological warfare and as an entry point for reinscribing Kashmir on the international agenda as a human rights issue. The loose-ends and the contradictions in the story expose a tissue of lies by many persons at many levels".

Following the release of the Press Council's report, government authorities dismissed all of the allegations of mass rape as groundless. In September, the case was declared "un-fit for launching criminal prosecution" and was closed after a month.

Criticism
The Press Council's dismissal of allegation was criticized by Human Rights Watch. It stated that although the results of the examinations failed to prove the charges of rape, they still raised questions on activity of the army in Kunan Poshpora. According to HRW, the committee had dismissed any evidence that may contradict the government version of events. The HRW report accused the committee of being more concerned about countering the criticism than uncovering truth.

The United States Department of State, in its 1992 report on international human rights, stated that there was "credible evidence" that supports the mass rape charges against the army unit at Kunan Poshpora.

Litigation
In 2004, one of the alleged victims approached the J&K State Human Rights Commission seeking a reinvestigation of the case. In 2007, more women approached the SHRC for reopening of the case. The villagers from the two villages formed Kunan-Poshpora Coordination Committee (KCC) headed by 70-year-old man Ghulam Ahmad Dar to seek justice for the victims. 

In October 2011, the Jammu & Kashmir Human Rights Commission asked the J&K government to reinvestigate the alleged mass rape case and compensate the victims.

A writ petition filed in the Jammu and Kashmir High Court in 2013 alleged that more than 30 women had been raped. The charges had not been proved and there had been no progress in trial. The High Court observed that it hoped the committee appointed by the J&K government would examine and quickly implement the recommendations of the SHRC.

In December 2017, the J&K government approached the Supreme Court of India against orders of the High Court. The top court directed that the appeals should be heard expeditiously.

Social impact
The Indian Express reported on 21 July 2013 that the victims and their families are being socially ostracised by other villagers in the locality. The only government school in the two affected villages teaches up to standard eight. The students going for higher education in the nearby Trehgam and Kupwara were taunted due to the incident and most of them choose to drop out after class eight. Families not involved in the incident at the same villages have disassociated socially with the victims' families. Villagers claimed that it was difficult to find grooms for their children.

See also 
 Do You Remember Kunan Poshpora?
 Rape during the Kashmir conflict

References

Conflicts in 1991
Political repression in India
Military scandals
1991 in India
Human rights abuses in Jammu and Kashmir
Rape in India